White Aryan Resistance (VAM) was a militant neo-nazi network active in Sweden between 1991 and 1993. The name of the group was derived from the US white supremacist organisation White Aryan Resistance (WAR).

According to Stieg Larsson, a researcher of white supremacist organizations, the group was rather styled on the then already defunct US white supremacist group The Order, led by Robert Matthews. VAM was founded by Klas Lund, other leading members were Torulf Magnusson and Peter Melander, editor of the group's magazine Storm. The organisation's symbol was the "Wolfsangel". VAM has been implicated in many serious crimes in Sweden, including the infamous Malexander police-murders, car bombings of political journalists and murders of perceived opponents. According to a report prepared and jointly published in November 1999 by Sweden's four largest daily newspapers, Aftonbladet, Expressen, Dagens Nyheter and Svenska Dagbladet, many former members of the organisation are members of present-day neo-Nazi organisations.

After VAM, Klas Lund organised the self-declared Nordic Resistance Movement. Another VAM offshoot was the now-defunct National Socialist Front which was formed in 1994 by VAM sympathisers in Karlskrona.

References

Neo-Nazi organizations
Neo-fascist terrorism
Neo-Nazism in Sweden
Racism in Sweden
1991 establishments in Sweden
1993 disestablishments in Sweden
Organizations established in 1991
Organizations disestablished in 1993